ν Serpentis, Latinized as Nu Serpentis, is a solitary star in the Serpens Cauda section of the equatorial constellation of Serpens. It is a white-hued star that is faintly visible to the naked eye with an apparent visual magnitude of 4.32. Based upon an annual parallax shift of 16.05 mas as seen from the Sun, it is about 203 light years from the Sun. The star is drifting further away with a radial velocity of +5 km/s.

This is an A-type main-sequence star with a stellar classification of A2V, and is generating energy through hydrogen fusion at its core. It is 350 million years old with a high rate of spin, showing a projected rotational velocity of 123 km/s. The star has 2.64 times the mass of the Sun and 3.0 times the Sun's radius. It is radiating 76 times the Sun's luminosity from its photosphere at an effective temperature of 9,120 K. Nu Serpentis has an optical companion, a magnitude +9.4 star at an angular separation of 46 arcseconds.

References

External links
 

A-type main-sequence stars
Serpens (constellation)
Serpentis, Nu
BD-12 4722
Serpentis, 53
156928
084880
6446